The Clerve is a river flowing through Luxembourg, joining the Wiltz at Kautenbach.  It flows through both the towns of Troisvierges and the town of Clervaux. Upstream of Clervaux, it is known as the Woltz.

References 

Rivers of the Ardennes (Luxembourg)
Rivers of Luxembourg